This is a list of electoral divisions and wards in the ceremonial county of Surrey in South East England. All changes since the re-organisation of local government following the passing of the Local Government Act 1972 are shown. The number of councillors elected for each electoral division or ward is shown in brackets.

County council

Surrey
Electoral Divisions from 1 April 1974 (first election 12 April 1973) to 7 May 1981:

Electoral Divisions from 7 May 1981 to 5 May 2005:

Electoral Divisions from 5 May 2005 to 2 May 2013:

† minor boundary changes in 2009

Electoral Divisions from 2 May 2013 to present:

District councils

Elmbridge
Wards from 1 April 1974 (first election 7 June 1973) to 6 May 1976:

Wards from 6 May 1976 to 4 May 2000:

Wards from 4 May 2000 to 5 May 2016:

Wards from 5 May 2016 to present:

Epsom and Ewell
Wards from 1 April 1974 (first election 7 June 1973) to 6 May 1976:

Wards from 6 May 1976 to 1 May 2003:

Wards from 1 May 2003 to present:

Guildford
Wards from 1 April 1974 (first election 7 June 1973) to 6 May 1976:

Wards from 6 May 1976 to 1 May 2003:

Wards from 1 May 2003 to present:

Mole Valley
Wards from 1 April 1974 (first election 7 June 1973) to 6 May 1976:

Wards from 6 May 1976 to 4 May 2000:

Wards from 4 May 2000 to present:

Reigate and Banstead
Wards from 1 April 1974 (first election 7 June 1973) to 3 May 1979:

Wards from 3 May 1979 to 4 May 2000:

Wards from 4 May 2000 to 2 May 2019:

Wards from 2 May 2019 to present:

Runnymede
Wards from 1 April 1974 (first election 7 June 1973) to 6 May 1976:

Wards from 6 May 1976 to 4 May 2000:

Wards from 4 May 2000 to present:

Spelthorne
Wards from 1 April 1974 (first election 7 June 1973) to 3 May 1979:

Wards from 3 May 1979 to 1 May 2003:

Wards from 1 May 2003 to present:

Surrey Heath
Wards from 1 April 1974 (first election 7 June 1973) to 6 May 1976:

Wards from 6 May 1976 to 1 May 2003:

Wards from 1 May 2003 to present:

Tandridge
Wards from 1 April 1974 (first election 7 June 1973) to 6 May 1976:

Wards from 6 May 1976 to 4 May 2000:

Wards from 4 May 2000 to present:

† minor boundary changes in 2007

Waverley
Wards from 1 April 1974 (first election 7 June 1973) to 5 May 1983:

Wards from 5 May 1983 to 1 May 2003:

Wards from 1 May 2003 to present:

Woking
Wards from 1 April 1974 (first election 7 June 1973) to 6 May 1976:

Wards from 6 May 1976 to 4 May 2000:

Wards from 4 May 2000 to 5 May 2016:

Wards from 5 May 2016 to present:

Electoral wards by constituency

East Surrey
Bletchingley and Nutfield, Burstow, Horne and Outwood, Chaldon, Dormansland and Felcourt, Felbridge, Godstone, Harestone, Horley Central, Horley East, Horley West, Limpsfield, Lingfield and Crowhurst, Oxted North and Tandridge, Oxted South, Portley, Queens Park, Tatsfield and Titsey, Valley, Warlingham East and Chelsham and Farleigh, Warlingham West, Westway, Whyteleafe, Woldingham.

Epsom and Ewell
Ashtead Common, Ashtead Park, Ashtead Village, Auriol, College, Court, Cuddington, Ewell, Ewell Court, Nonsuch, Nork, Ruxley, Stamford, Stoneleigh, Tattenhams, Town, West Ewell, Woodcote.

Esher and Walton
Claygate, Cobham and Downside, Cobham Fairmile, Esher, Hersham North, Hersham South, Hinchley Wood, Long Ditton, Molesey East, Molesey North, Molesey South, Oxshott and Stoke D’Abernon, Thames Ditton, Walton Ambleside, Walton Central, Walton North, Walton South, Weston Green.

Guildford
Alfold, Cranleigh Rural and Ellens Green, Burpham, Blackheath and Wonersh, Christchurch, Cranleigh East, Cranleigh West, Ewhurst, Friary and St Nicolas, Holy Trinity, Merrow, Onslow, Pilgrims, Shalford, Shamley Green and Cranleigh North, Stoke, Stoughton, Westborough, Worplesdon.

Mole Valley
Beare Green, Bookham North, Bookham South, Box Hill and Headley, Brockham, Betchworth and Buckland, Capel, Leigh and Newdigate, Charlwood, Clandon and Horsley, Dorking North, Dorking South, Effingham, Fetcham East, Fetcham West, Holmwoods, Leatherhead North, Leatherhead South, Leith Hill, Lovelace, Mickleham, Westhumble and Pixham, Okewood, Send, Tillingbourne, Westcott.

Reigate
Banstead Village, Chipstead, Hooley and Woodmansterne, Earlswood and Whitebushes, Kingswood with Burgh Heath, Meadvale and St John's, Merstham, Preston, Redhill East, Redhill West, Reigate Central, Reigate Hill, Salfords and Sidlow, South Park and Woodhatch, Tadworth and Walton.

Runnymede and Weybridge
Addlestone Bourneside, Addlestone North, Chertsey Meads, Chertsey St Ann's, Chertsey South and Row Town, Egham Hythe, Egham Town, Englefield Green East, Englefield Green West, Foxhills, New Haw, Oatlands Park, St George's Hill, Thorpe, Virginia Water, Weybridge North, Weybridge South, Woodham.

South West Surrey
Bramley, Busbridge and Hascombe, Chiddingfold and Dunsfold, Elstead and Thursley, Farnham Bourne, Farnham Castle, Farnham Firgrove, Farnham Hale and Heath End, Farnham Moor Park, Farnham Shortheath and Boundstone, Farnham Upper Hale, Farnham Weybourne and Badshot Lea, Farnham Wrecclesham and Rowledge, Frensham, Dockenfield and Tilford, Godalming Binscombe, Godalming Central and Ockford, Godalming Charterhouse, Godalming Farncombe and Catteshall, Godalming Holloway, Haslemere Critchmere and Shottermill, Haslemere East and Grayswood, Hindhead, Milford, Witley and Hambledon.

Spelthorne
Ashford Common, Ashford East, Ashford North and Stanwell South, Ashford Town, Halliford and Sunbury West, Laleham and Shepperton Green, Riverside and Laleham, Shepperton Town, Staines, Staines South, Stanwell North, Sunbury Common, Sunbury East.

Surrey Heath
Ash South and Tongham, Ash Vale, Ash Wharf, Bagshot, Bisley, Chobham, Frimley, Frimley Green, Heatherside, Lightwater, Mytchett And Deepcut, Old Dean, Parkside, St Michaels, St Pauls, Town, Watchetts, West End, Windlesham.

Woking
Brookwood, Byfleet, Goldsworth East, Goldsworth West, Hermitage and Knaphill South, Horsell East and Woodham, Horsell West, Kingfield and Westfield, Knaphill, Maybury and Sheerwater, Mayford and Sutton Green, Mount Hermon East, Mount Hermon West, Normandy, Old Woking, Pirbright, Pyrford, St John's and Hook Heath, West Byfleet.

See also
List of parliamentary constituencies in Surrey

References

Politics of Surrey
Surrey